Dunckerocampus pessuliferus (yellowbanded pipefish), occasionally Doryrhamphus pessuliferus, is a species of marine fish of the family Syngnathidae. It is a coastal species, inhabiting waters around the Coral Triangle, including the Philippines, Indonesia, and northwestern Australia. It is an active cleaner, feeding off of parasitic crustaceans growing on other fishes. The adult fish form pairs and are normally observed swimming along the bottom around large remote coral heads on muddy slopes. This species is ovoviviparous, with males carrying eggs and giving birth to live young.

It occasionally makes its way into the aquarium trade, but is protected in Australia under the Environment Protection and Biodiversity Conservation Act 1999.

Identifying features

The head and body of D. pessuliferus have alternating reddish-brown and yellow bands, while the tail is mostly red with a yellow spot in the center and marginal white markings.

References

Further reading
iNaturalist

External links
 

pessuliferus
Marine fish
Fish described in 1938